N.W.A was an American hip hop group from Compton, California. Formed in 1986, the group went through a number of lineup changes, and throughout its tenure featured members Eazy-E, Dr. Dre, DJ Yella, Ice Cube, Arabian Prince and MC Ren.

The first release by N.W.A was the single "Panic Zone" in 1987, which was later featured on the compilation N.W.A. and the Posse along with B-sides "Dope Man" and "8 Ball". After MC Ren was added to the lineup, the group recorded and released its first full-length album, Straight Outta Compton in 1988. Produced by Dre and Yella, the album sold over three million copies, and featured such seminal songs as "Straight Outta Compton", "Fuck tha Police" and "Gangsta Gangsta".

Ice Cube left N.W.A in 1989, due to a number of "financial disagreements". In 1990, the group released the extended play 100 Miles and Runnin', supported by the single of the same name, which featured five new tracks. The follow-up to Straight Outta Compton, Niggaz4Life (commonly known as Efil4zaggin), was released the following year, supported by the singles "Appetite for Destruction" and "Alwayz into Somethin'". Dre left the group shortly after the album's release, and began a feud with fellow member Eazy-E, who later died in 1995.

Dr. Dre, MC Ren and Ice Cube later took part in a brief reunion, releasing the single "Chin Check" featuring Snoop Dogg in 1999, a song featured on the Next Friday soundtrack. The song "Hello" was also released on Ice Cube's 2000 album War & Peace Vol. 2 (The Peace Disc).

Songs

References

N.W.A